MasterChef Chile is a Chilean television competitive cooking show based on the original British MasterChef. It is presented by Diana Bolocco accompanied by French chef Yann Yvin, Chilean chef Christopher Carpentier, and Italian Chef Ennio Carota as the show's main judges. It is produced and broadcast on Canal 13. The first episode aired on 26 October 2014, and the series one finale was broadcast on 2 February 2015. The first winner was Daniela Castro, a 26-year-old artist.

The second season premiered on 18 October 2015 and ended on 28 January 2016. The winner was Alfonso Castro, a 63-year-old waiter, becoming the oldest winner of MasterChef history. Masterchef Chile has also spawned a spin-off series Junior Masterchef which featured only younger contestants and premiered on Sunday 20 March 2016. The third and last season was premiered on 5 March 2017, with Spanish chef Sergi Arola joining in as the new judge, in place of Frenchman Yann Yvin.

Judges

Present

Previous

Season 1: 2014-2015

Season 2: 2015-16

Junior: 2016

Season 3: 2017

Season 4: 2019

Celebrity: 2020

Celebrity 2: 2021

References

External links 
  

Chile
Chilean reality television series
Canal 13 (Chilean TV channel) original programming
2014 Chilean television series debuts
Non-British television series based on British television series